is a JR East railway station located in the city of Daisen, Akita Prefecture, Japan.

Lines
Kariwano Station is served by the Ōu Main Line, and is located 260.6 km from the terminus of the line at Fukushima Station.

Station layout
Kariwano Station consists of a single island platform serving two tracks, connected to the station building by a footbridge. Track 1 is dual gauge for use by through traffic of the Akita Shinkansen. The station is attended.

Platforms

History
Kariwano Station was opened on August 21, 1904 on the Japanese Government Railways (JGR), serving the town of Kariwano. The JGR became the Japan National Railways (JNR) after World War II. The station was absorbed into the JR East network upon the privatization of the JNR on April 1, 1987. A new station building was completed in February 1990, which incorporates the offices of the local chamber of commerce and tourism office.

Passenger statistics
In fiscal 2018, the station was used by an average of 310 passengers daily (boarding passengers only).

Surrounding area
Kariwano Post Office

References

External links

 JR East Station information 

Railway stations in Japan opened in 1904
Railway stations in Akita Prefecture
Ōu Main Line
Daisen, Akita